The 1991 Big Eight men's basketball tournament was held March 8–10 at Kemper Arena in Kansas City, Missouri.

Fourth-seeded Missouri defeated #3 seed Nebraska in the championship game, 90–82. The Tigers were ineligible to play in the 1991 NCAA tournament. Kansas, Oklahoma State, and Nebraska received at-large bids.

Bracket

References

Tournament
Big Eight Conference men's basketball tournament
Big Eight Conference men's basketball tournament
Big Eight Conference men's basketball tournament